Samer Majali is a Jordanian businessman and was the CEO of Gulf Air from 2009 until his resignation was announced on 2 December 2012. He served as the CEO until 31 December 2012 and currently is the CEO of Royal Jordanian.

Biography

Majali has also served as the CEO of Royal Jordanian airlines from 2002-2009, and was credited for transforming the airline into one of the most successful in the region. Under his management, the airline recorded its first ever net profit. Upon his successful management of RJ, he was persuaded by the Government of Bahrain to assume the position of CEO of Gulf Air in 2009. His career began in 1979.

He attended Dean Close School and Cranfield University in England.

References

External links
  A biography of Samer Majali (archived) Global Travel Tourism
 
 

Living people
Jordanian businesspeople
Year of birth missing (living people)
People educated at Dean Close School
Alumni of Cranfield University
Royal Jordanian people